Suau may refer to:

Bwanabwana language of Papua New Guinea
Bwanabwana Rural LLG of Papua New Guinea